Albert Thomas Lyons (5 March 1902 – 10 May 1981) was a professional footballer who played at full-back for Port Vale, Walsall, Clapton Orient, Tottenham Hotspur and Colwyn Bay. One of four brothers, two of his siblings also played League football.

Career
Lyons spent the early part of his career at Port Vale and Walsall. In September 1926, he signed for Clapton Orient, and helped the club to narrowly avoid relegation out of the Second Division in 1926–27. They again escaped the drop in 1927–28, finishing one place and one point above relegated Fulham. However they came last in 1928–29, and finished 12th in the Third Division South in 1929–30. He signed for Tottenham Hotspur in May 1930, and helped "Spurs" to finish third in the Second Division in 1930–31, and then eighth in 1931–32, before they finally won promotion with a second-place finish in 1932–33. Lyons featured in 57 games and scoring three goals during his time at White Hart Lane. Lyons ended his playing career at Colwyn Bay.

Career statistics
Source:

References

1902 births
1981 deaths
People from Hednesford
English footballers
Association football fullbacks
Port Vale F.C. players
Walsall F.C. players
Leyton Orient F.C. players
Tottenham Hotspur F.C. players
Colwyn Bay F.C. players
English Football League players